Malika Zeghal (born 1965) is a Tunisian Professor in Contemporary Islamic Thought and Life at Harvard University, and formerly an associate professor of the anthropology and sociology of religion in the University of Chicago Divinity School.

Biography 
She was a student of the École Normale Supérieure and received her doctorate from the Institut d'Etudes Politiques de Paris in 1994. She began her postdoctoral research in 1995 at the Hagop Kevorkian Center for Near Eastern Studies at New York University before returning to France to join for ten years, the Centre national de la recherche scientifique from 1995 to 2005. She is a Member of the Scientific Council of the Tunisian Academy of Sciences, Letters, and Arts.

Her work, Gardiens de l'Islam, written in French is an analysis of the influence of the ulama of Al-Azhar University. A. Marsot argues her thesis is that "the ulama of the Azhar believe that it is their duty, daʿwa, as the guardians of religion to see that the laws of a country conform to the shariʿa; thus, their struggle with the authorities is defined by an attempt to set aside the laws of the state in favor of the shariʿa." The book explores how state interactions with the Azhari ulama helped to lead to the rise other Islamic movements, namely the Muslim Brotherhood, outside of traditional institutions.

Courses Taught

In 2013, she taught a course at Harvard University's School of Divinity called "HDS 3361: Political Islam in the 20th and 21st Centuries".

Bibliography 
 Gardiens de l'Islam. Les oulémas d'al-Azhar dans l'Egypte contemporaine Presses de Sciences Po, 1996. 
 Les islamistes marocains: le défi à la monarchie La Découverte, 2005.

References 

 "Malika Zeghal." University of Chicago Divinity School page

External links
Malika Zeghal at the University of Chicago Divinity School

1965 births
Living people
École Normale Supérieure alumni
University of Chicago faculty
Harvard College faculty
Tunisian anthropologists
Tunisian sociologists
Tunisian political scientists
Tunisian scholars of Islam
Radcliffe fellows
Women scholars of Islam
Women political scientists
Members of the Tunisian Academy of Sciences, Letters, and Arts
American Islamic studies scholars